Is This Tomorrow:  America Under Communism! was an anti-Communist, Red Scare propaganda comic book published by the Catholic Catechetical Guild Educational Society of St. Paul, Minnesota, in 1947.

Description
The stated purpose of the comic book was "to make you think!" about the allegedly 85,000 members of the Communist Party USA plus others who serve "as disciplined fifth columnists of the Kremlin" working "day and night–laying the groundwork to overthrow YOUR GOVERNMENT!" and reduce Americans to "Communist slavery."  Its 50 pages then describe a coup d'etat of the United States, led by a gullible American politician (who burns the Bible and dies just as the Communists come to power), aided by Communists who have infiltrated into high levels of the US government, and opposed by armed Catholic Americans (who are unsuccessful in stopping them).  Its back page urges readers to "Fight Communism with – Ten Commandments of Citizenship."

The comic book includes some of the first published comic drawings by Minneapolis-born Charles M. Schulz, creator of Peanuts.

Legacy
In January 1948, Woody Guthrie wrote a magazine article about the comic book that went unpublished, called "Comics that ain't funny."

In 1991-1992, the title revived as Is This Tomorrow? in Florida Flambeau, a student-run newspaper affiliated with Florida State University and Florida A&M in Tallahassee, FL.  In 2003-2005, it became a webcomic.

The comic book's cover forms the basis of the cover of the 2001 book Red Scared!:  The Commie Menace in Propaganda and Popular Culture.

Is This Tomorrow remains in print in the 2000s.

See also

 Is This Tomorrow?
 This Godless Communism (1961)
 Comic book
 Red baiting
 Propaganda

References

External links
 Archive.org - Is This Tomorrow?
 University of Pennsylvania - Is This Tomorrow?

Comics
Propaganda cartoons
Anti-communism in the United States
Red Scare
Communist Party USA
Propaganda
American comic strips

1947 comics debuts
Christian comics
Comics about politics